John Wallwork CBE FRCS FMedSci (born July 1946), is a retired cardiothoracic surgeon and emeritus professor who performed Europe's first successful combined heart-lung transplant in 1984, and in 1986 performed the world's first heart-lung and liver transplant with Sir Roy Calne.

In 2014, he became Chairman of Royal Papworth Hospital.

He was President of the International Society for Heart and Lung Transplantation (ISHLT) 1994–1995.. Wallwork is a Distinguished Supporter of Humanists UK.

References

Living people
1946 births
British cardiac surgeons
British thoracic surgeons
British transplant surgeons
Commanders of the Order of the British Empire
Fellows of the Academy of Medical Sciences (United Kingdom)
Fellows of the Royal College of Pathologists
Fellows of the Royal College of Physicians of Edinburgh
Fellows of the Royal College of Surgeons
Fellows of the Royal College of Surgeons of Edinburgh
People educated at Accrington Grammar School
People from Accrington
Alumni of the University of Edinburgh Medical School
1984 in medicine
1986 in medicine